Charles Gordon-Cumming-Dunbar (b Elgin 14 February 1844 - d Ramsgate 8 January 1916)  was an Anglican priest in  the late nineteenth and early twentieth centuries.

He was educated at Winchester College and the University of Jena; and ordained in 1867. His first post was as Chaplain to the Bishop of Colombo. After that he refused the chance to be the first Bishop of Pretoria but accepted the Archdeaconry of Grenada, serving from 1875 to 1877. On his return he held incumbencies at Little Heath and Walthamstow.

On 17 October 1872 he married Edith Wentworth (1845–1891), youngest daughter of William Charles Wentworth. He had one daughter Beatrix Leyla Marjorie Wentworth who died on 8 January 1919, leaving issue.

References

1844 births
People from Elgin, Moray
Anglican chaplains
People educated at Winchester College
Baronets in the Baronetage of Nova Scotia
University of Jena alumni
Archdeacons of Grenada
1916 deaths